Marcus A. Williams (born December 12, 1977) is a former American football tight end who played in the National Football League (NFL) for one season with the Oakland Raiders. Signed to the Raiders' active roster in 2002, Williams' career came to an abrupt end due to injuries sustained from being punched by teammate Bill Romanowski during the 2003 training camp. Williams subsequently sued Romanowski and won over $300,000 in damages.

Early life and college career
Born in Oakland, California, Williams graduated from Berkeley High School in nearby Berkeley. He began his college football career at the junior college level at Laney College in Oakland in 1997. After two seasons at Laney, Williams transferred to Washington State University, where he majored in humanities and played for the Washington State Cougars in 1999 and 2000 under head coach Mike Price. At Washington State, Williams played at wide receiver and had 61 receptions for 1,086 yards and eight touchdowns.

Pro career
Williams was not selected in the 2001 NFL Draft. The Indianapolis Colts signed Williams as a free agent on April 27, 2001, and released him on August 27. On December 5, 2001, the Oakland Raiders signed Williams to the practice squad.

The Raiders designated Williams to the Amsterdam Admirals of NFL Europe on February 11, 2002. Due to a back injury, Williams sat out the first two weeks of the NFL Europe season. On week three, Williams was reassigned to the Frankfurt Galaxy, and he made his debut on April 27 against the Scottish Claymores. Williams played five games off the bench at tight end, during which he had one reception, a two-yard touchdown. On September 28, 2002, Williams signed with the Oakland Raiders, playing 14 games off the bench and making 11 special teams tackles during a season when the Raiders won the AFC title. His season ended on January 23, 2003, when he was placed on injured reserve.

During training camp on August 24, 2003, teammate Bill Romanowski took Williams' helmet off and punched him in the face, breaking his left eye socket and chipping a tooth. Williams was again placed on injured reserve, and he filed a civil lawsuit against Romanowski in Alameda County Superior Court in October 2003. On March 22, 2005, a jury awarded Williams $340,000, specifically $300,000 for the salary that Williams would have made in 2003 and $40,000 for medical expenses. Romanowski paid Williams an additional $75,000 settlement on May 27 that year.

References

External links
NFL.com profile

1977 births
Living people
Players of American football from Oakland, California
American football tight ends
Washington State Cougars football players
Oakland Raiders players
Players of American football from Berkeley, California
Laney Eagles football players
Frankfurt Galaxy players
American expatriate sportspeople in the Netherlands
American expatriate sportspeople in Germany
American expatriate players of American football